The 1994 Copa CONMEBOL was the third edition of CONMEBOL's annual club tournament. Teams that failed to qualify for the Copa Libertadores played in this tournament. Sixteen teams from nine South American football confederations qualified for this tournament. as in 1993, Colombia sent no representatives. São Paulo defeated Peñarol in the finals.

Qualified teams

Bracket

First round

|}

Quarterfinals

|}

Semifinals

|}

Finals

|}

External links
CONMEBOL 1994 at RSSSF
CONMEBOL 1994 at CONMEBOL Official Website

Copa CONMEBOL
3